The year 1873 in science and technology involved some significant events, listed below.

Chemistry
 Jacobus Henricus van 't Hoff and Joseph Achille Le Bel, working independently, develop a model of chemical bonding that explains the chirality experiments of Pasteur and provides a physical cause for optical activity in chiral compounds.

Exploration

 The Austro-Hungarian North Pole Expedition discovers Franz-Josef Land

Mathematics
 Charles Hermite proves that the mathematical constant e is a transcendental number
 Henri Brocard introduces the Brocard points, Brocard triangle and Brocard circle

Meteorology
 September 15 – agreement for establishment of the International Meteorological Organization

Physics
 February 20 – English electrical engineer Willoughby Smith publishes his discovery of the photoconductivity of the element selenium
 June 14 – Johannes Diderik van der Waals defends his thesis, Over de Continuiteit van den Gas en Vloeistoftoestand (On the continuity of the gaseous and liquid state) at Leiden University; in this, he introduces the concepts of molecular volume and molecular attraction; gives a semi-quantitative description of the phenomena of condensation and critical temperatures; and derives the van der Waals equation
 September 22 – James Clerk Maxwell delivers a discourse on molecules to the British Association for the Advancement of Science meeting in Bradford
 December – J. Willard Gibbs describes the principle of Gibbs free energy
 James Clerk Maxwell's A Treatise on Electricity and Magnetism first presents the partial differential equations known as Maxwell's equations which form the foundation of classical electrodynamics, optics and electric circuits
 Frederick Guthrie is the first to report observing thermionic emission

Physiology and medicine
 June 18 – Alice Vickery passes the Royal Pharmaceutical Society's examination, becoming the first qualified female pharmacist in the United Kingdom
 Mycobacterium leprae, the causative agent of leprosy, is discovered by Norwegian physician Gerhard Armauer Hansen. It is the first bacterium to be identified as pathogenic in humans.
 Camillo Golgi first publishes a demonstration of Golgi's method.

Technology
 May 20 – Jacob W. Davis and Levi Strauss receive United States patent#139121 for using copper rivets to strengthen the pockets of denim jeans
 Carl von Linde installs his first commercial refrigeration system, built by Maschinenfabrik Augsburg for the Spaten Brewery and using dimethyl ether as the refrigerant
 Christopher Miner Spencer introduces the fully automatic turret lathe

Awards
 Copley Medal: Hermann Helmholtz
 Wollaston Medal for geology: Philip de Malpas Grey Egerton

Births
 February 11 – Louis Charles Christopher Krieger (died 1940), American mycologist
 February 12 – Barnum Brown (died 1963), American paleontologist
 March 5 – Thomas Harrison Montgomery, Jr. (died 1912), American zoologist and cell biologist
 April 25 – Félix d'Herelle (died 1949), French-Canadian microbiologist, a co-discoverer of bacteriophages
 June 28 – Alexis Carrel (died 1942), French surgeon, biologist and winner of a Nobel Prize in Physiology or Medicine
 June 30 – Friedrich Karl Georg Fedde (died 1942), German botanist
 July 7 – Sándor Ferenczi (died 1933), Hungarian psychoanalyst
 October 4 – Dimitrie Pompeiu (died 1954), Romanian mathematician
 October 9 – Karl Schwarzschild (died 1916), German astronomer and physicist

Deaths
 January 27 – Adam Sedgwick (born 1785), English geologist
 February 1 – Matthew Fontaine Maury (born 1806), American oceanographer
 April 18 – Justus von Liebig (born 1803), German chemist
 March 10 – John Torrey (born 1796), American botanist
 March 30 – Bénédict Morel (born 1809), French psychiatrist
 September 15 – Alexei Pavlovich Fedchenko (born 1844), Russian naturalist
 September 24 – John Thurnam (born 1810), English psychiatrist and ethnologist
 October 17 – Robert McClure (born 1807), British Arctic explorer
 December 14 – Louis Agassiz (born 1807), Swiss-American zoologist and geologist

References

 
19th century in science
1870s in science